Chester Hill railway station is located on the Main South line, serving the Sydney suburb of Chester Hill. It is served by Sydney Trains T3 Bankstown line services.

History
Chester Hill station opened on 8 October 1924 when the Main South line was extended from Regents Park to Cabramatta.

To the south of the station lies the Southern Sydney Freight Line that opened in January 2013.

Platforms and services
Historically Chester Hill was served by services from the city and Lidcombe operating to Liverpool. This changed in the early 2000s, when most services to Liverpool were altered to operate via Bankstown. 
Today Chester Hill is served by T3 Bankstown line services terminating at Liverpool and three Liverpool – City via Strathfield services on weekdays. The NSW Government Future Transport Strategy 2056 (November 2020 Edition) includes Chester Hill as the interchange station on the proposed Parramatta to Kogarah via Bankstown line.

Transport links
Transdev NSW operate five routes via Chester Hill station:
911: Bankstown station to Auburn station
916: to Guildford station
M91: Parramatta station to Hurstville
S2: Sefton to Granville station
S4: to Fairfield

Chester Hill station is served by one NightRide route:
N50: Liverpool station to Town Hall station

References

External links

Chester Hill station details Transport for New South Wales

Chester Hill, New South Wales
Easy Access railway stations in Sydney
Railway stations in Sydney
Railway stations in Australia opened in 1924
Main Southern railway line, New South Wales